Derek Andrew Beard (born 10 September 1961) is a former New Zealand cricketer who played first-class and List A cricket for Northern Districts from 1987 to 1991. His father, Don Beard, played Test cricket for New Zealand in the 1950s.

A medium-pace bowler, Beard's best first-class figures were 6 for 18 (off 10 overs) against Central Districts in 1989–90. In List A cricket his best figures were 5 for 34, the first five wickets to fall, also against Central Districts, in 1990–91.

A science teacher at Mount Maunganui College, Beard played 105 representative matches for Bay of Plenty. In 2016 he was awarded life membership of the Bay of Plenty Cricket Association.

References

External links
 
 Derek Beard at CricketArchive

1961 births
Living people
New Zealand cricketers
Northern Districts cricketers
Sportspeople from Te Aroha
Cricketers from Waikato